Plzeň municipal election in 2002 was held as part of Czech municipal elections, 2002. It was held on 1 and 2 November 2002. The Civic Democratic Party won the election with 38% of the votes. The incumbent Mayor Jiří Šneberger was reelected.

Results

Aftermath
Šneberger became the mayor. He himself stated that it would be his last term. He left the office in 2002 when he was elected a Senator. Šeberger was replaced by Miroslav Kalous.

References

External links
 Results

2002
2002 elections in Europe
2002 elections in the Czech Republic